Veliki Lipovec is a village in the Municipality of Žužemberk in southeastern Slovenia. The area is part of the historical region of Lower Carniola and is now included in the Southeast Slovenia Statistical Region.

Notable people
Notable people that were born or lived in Veliki Lipovec include:
Janez Frančišek Gnidovec (1873–1939), bishop of Skopje

References

External links
Veliki Lipovec at Geopedia

Populated places in the Municipality of Žužemberk